Nasirpur is a village in Shahkot in Jalandhar district of Punjab State, India. The village is administrated by a sarpanch who is an elected representative of the village according to the Panchayati Raj, the system of governance in rural areas.

Population
According to the 2011 census, Nasirpur has 155 households with a population of 781 (399 male and 382 female). The number of children in the age group 0-6 as 41.

Transport 
Shahkot Malisian station is the nearest train station.

References 

Villages in Jalandhar district